John Langham may refer to:
 Sir John Langham, 1st Baronet, English politician
 Sir John Charles Patrick Langham, 14th Baronet, Irish landowner and botanical artist